Holding All the Roses is the fourth studio album by American rock band Blackberry Smoke. It was released on February 10, 2015 via Rounder. The title track was featured in Madden NFL 16

Reception
The album has been given a Metacritic rating of 76 based on 9 reviews, indicating generally favorable reviews.

The album debuted at No. 1 on the Top Country Albums chart, and No. 29 on the Billboard 200, selling 19,200 copies for the week. The album has sold 49,600 copies in the US as of September 2015.

Track listing

Personnel

Musicians 
Charlie Starr - lead vocals, guitar, pedal steel, banjo. 
Richard Turner - bass guitar, vocals.
Paul Jackson - guitar, vocals. 
Brandon Still - piano, organ.
Brit Turner - drums, percussion.

Charts

Weekly charts

Year-end charts

References

2015 albums
Blackberry Smoke albums
Rounder Records albums
Albums produced by Brendan O'Brien (record producer)